Ng Yuen Ki (born 20 December 1997) is a Hongkonger footballer who plays as a goalkeeper for Hong Kong Women League club Happy Valley and the Hong Kong women's national team.

International career
Ng Yuen Ki represented Hong Kong at the 2013 AFC U-16 Women's Championship qualification, the 2014 Incheon Asian Games, the 2015 AFC U-19 Women's Championship qualification, the 2014 East Asian Cup preliminary competition round 2, the 2019 EAFF E-1 Football Championship and the 2020 AFC Women's Olympic Qualifying Tournament.

See also
List of Hong Kong women's international footballers

References

1997 births
Living people
Hong Kong women's footballers
Women's association football goalkeepers
Hong Kong women's international footballers
Footballers at the 2014 Asian Games
Asian Games competitors for Hong Kong